The Stone Carvers is a 1984 American short documentary film directed by Marjorie Hunt and Paul Wagner and starring Vincent Palumbo and Roger Morigi. In 1985, it won an Oscar for Documentary Short Subject at the 57th Academy Awards.

Cast
 Vincent Palumbo as Himself
 Roger Morigi as Himself

References

External links
 at Paul Wagner Productions

1984 films
1984 short films
1984 documentary films
1984 independent films
1980s short documentary films
American short documentary films
Best Documentary Short Subject Academy Award winners
American independent films
Documentary films about visual artists
1980s English-language films
1980s American films